Cimarron Municipal Airport  is in Gray County, Kansas, United States, two miles north of Cimarron, which owns it.

Facilities

In the year ending June 13, 2006 the airport had 3,500 general aviation aircraft operations, average 10 per day. Ten aircraft were then based at the airport,
all single-engine.

References

External links

Airports in Kansas
Buildings and structures in Gray County, Kansas